A Ulloa is a comarca in the province of Lugo, Galicia, in northwestern Spain.

Municipalities
Municipalities include Antas de Ulla (capital), Monterroso, and Palas de Rei.

A Ulloa